Hyaluronidase-2 is a multifunctional protein, previously thought to only possess acid-active hyaluronan-degrading enzymatic function. In humans it is encoded by the HYAL2 gene.

This gene encodes a protein which is similar in structure to hyaluronidases. Hyaluronidases intracellularly degrade hyaluronan, one of the major glycosaminoglycans of the extracellular matrix. Hyaluronan is thought to be involved in cell proliferation, migration and differentiation. 

Varying functions have been described for this protein. It has been described as a lysosomal hyaluronidase which is active at a pH below 4 and specifically hydrolyzes high molecular weight hyaluronan. It has also been described as a GPI-anchored cell surface protein which does not display hyaluronidase activity but does serve as a receptor for the oncogenic virus Jaagsiekte sheep retrovirus. The gene is one of several related genes in a region of chromosome 3p21.3 associated with tumor suppression. This gene encodes two alternatively spliced transcript variants which differ only in the 5' UTR.

One study found associations between cleft lip and palate and mutations in the HYAL2 gene.

An investigation published in 2017, attributed an additional function to the Hyaluronidase 2 (HYAL2) protein. The study found interactions between HYAL2 and proteins involved in the alternative splicing of CD44 pre-mRNA. Another study published in 2020, described roles for HYAL2 in the orchestration of cytoskeletal components involved in myofibroblast contraction. These recent discoveries suggest a broader regulatory role for the HYAL2 protein in cell biology.

References

Further reading